The 1994–95 season was Dynamo Dresden's fourth, and to date last, season in the Bundesliga. It was a fairly disastrous season for the club – they finished at the bottom of the table, winning only four league games, including a 21-game winless streak, from October to May. The club got through three managers: Sigfried Held was replaced by another former Germany international striker, Horst Hrubesch, who lasted only four months, before former Dynamo forward Ralf Minge took over for the remainder of the season.

The squad had seen some turnover in pre-season, with last season's top scorer Olaf Marschall leaving for 1. FC Kaiserslautern and midfield pairing Piotr Nowak and Miroslav Stevic joining 1860 Munich. In mid-season, Dynamo turned to two veteran Bundesliga strikers, Jørn Andersen and Herbert Waas, but neither was able to make an impact – neither player scored for the club. One highlight was the emergence of future Germany international Jens Jeremies, who played in the last ten games of the season, while Australian goalkeeper Mark Schwarzer made his first appearances in European football, as understudy to Stanislav Cherchesov.

Having been relegated to the 2. Bundesliga at the end of the season, Dynamo were dropped down another level, to the third-tier Regionalliga Nordost, due to financial irregularities.

Squad

Results

Bundesliga

DFB-Pokal

Transfers

External links
Season details at fussballdaten 

Dynamo Dresden seasons
Dynamo Dresden